French electronic music duo Air has released six studio albums, one collaborative studio album, two soundtrack albums, one mix album, one compilation album, one remix album, two video albums, one extended play, twenty-two singles and sixteen music videos. The band's first release was the 1995 single "Modular Mix", which peaked at number 177 in the United Kingdom. Their debut extended play, Premiers Symptômes, was released in July 1997; it peaked at number 12 in the UK and was certified silver by the British Phonographic Industry (BPI). Moon Safari, Air's debut studio album, was released in January 1998. It peaked at number 21 in France and was certified gold by the Syndicat National de l'Édition Phonographique (SNEP). Moon Safari reached the top ten in countries such as Ireland and the UK and produced three singles: "Sexy Boy", "Kelly Watch the Stars" and "All I Need". All three singles reached the top 40 in the UK; "Sexy Boy" and "All I Need" reached the top 25 in Finland and the Netherlands respectively.

In 1999, Air composed the score for the film The Virgin Suicides, and an accompanying album was released in February 2000. The album peaked at number 34 in France and was certified gold by the SNEP. "Playground Love", the album's only single, peaked at number 25 in the UK. The band's second studio album, 10 000 Hz Legend, was released in May 2001, peaking at number seven in France and charting highly in several European countries. 10 000 Hz Legend produced four singles: "Radio #1", which peaked at number 31 in the UK, "Don't Be Light", "How Does It Make You Feel?" and "People in the City". City Reading (Tre Storie Western), a collaboration with Italian writer Alessandro Baricco, was released in May 2003. Talkie Walkie followed in January 2004, peaking at number three in France. It became the band's first number-one album in Ireland and received a gold certification from the Irish Recorded Music Association (IRMA). The album's lead single, "Cherry Blossom Girl", became a top 15 hit in Finland and charted in several other European countries. Pocket Symphony, the band's fourth studio album, was released in March 2007, peaking at number eight in France and producing two singles: "Once Upon a Time" and "Mer du Japon".

In October 2009, Air released their fifth studio album, Love 2; it peaked at number 12 in France. The album produced three singles: "Do the Joy", "Sing Sang Sung", which charted in the Belgian region of Wallonia, and "So Light Is Her Footfall". Le voyage dans la lune, the band's sixth studio album, was released in February 2012. It peaked at number 17 in France and produced two singles: "Seven Stars" and "Parade", the latter of which charted in the Belgian region of Flanders.

Albums

Studio albums

Collaborative albums

Soundtrack albums

Mix albums

Compilation albums

Remix albums

Video albums

Extended plays

Singles

Other appearances

Remix work

Music videos

Notes

References

External links
 Official website
 Air at AllMusic
 
 

Discographies of French artists
Electronic music group discographies
Pop music group discographies